Back Cove may refer to various places in North America:

Canada 

 Back Cove, Burgeo, Newfoundland and Labrador, a community
 Back Cove, Fogo, Newfoundland and Labrador, a small fishing village on Fogo Island
 Back Cove, Newfoundland and Labrador, a hamlet on the Labrador Coast
 Back Cove, a community near Baie Verte, Newfoundland and Labrador on the island of Newfoundland

United States 

 Back Cove (Maine), a nearly circular estuary basin on the northern side of the downtown district of Portland, Maine